George Clinton Rowe (1853–1903) was an American missionary, minister, and poet.  He is referred to in James T. Haley's ''Afro-American Encyclopaedia"" as the "Palmetto Poet".

Life and career
He was born in Litchfield, Connecticut.

He established the Sunday school with three Newtown children in his house. The popularity of the Bible sessions called for an expanded space. He became a minister at the Plymouth Congregational Church in Charleston, South Carolina and published verses. Rowe was also a printer at Virginia's Hampton Institute and established what became the Little England Chapel Sunday school.

Bibliography
"Thoughts in Verse" (1887)
"Toussaint L'Ouverture" (1890)
"Our Heroes: Patriotic Poems on Men, Women, and sayings of the Negro race"

References

1853 births
1903 deaths
African-American poets
Hampton University people
19th-century American poets
19th-century American male writers
Poets from Connecticut
People from Litchfield, Connecticut
20th-century African-American people
African-American male writers